is a Japanese tennis player. He has a career-high ATP ranking of World No. 138 achieved on 9 January 2023 and a doubles ranking of No. 374 achieved on 7 January 2019.
He is currently the No. 3 Japanese player.

Juniors
On the junior tour, Watanuki has a career high combined ranking of No. 2 achieved on 21 March 2016. Watanuki was the winner of the 2016 Campeonato Internacional Juvenil de Tenis de Porto Alegre, a Grade A event in Porto Alegre, Brazil.

Professional career

2018-19: Maiden ATP win and Challenger title
Watanuki first main draw match victory on the ATP Tour came at the 2018 Rakuten Japan Open over Robin Haase as a qualifier.

He won his maiden title at the 2019 Kobe Challenger.

2021-22: ATP quarterfinal, Two Challenger titles, Top 150 debut
Watanuki entered the 2021 Winston-Salem Open as a lucky loser and won his first match against Jaume Munar. He lost to Marton Fucsovics in the second round.

He reached the quarterfinals of an ATP tournament for the first time in his career, winning his first two matches in a row at this level, as a lucky loser at the 2022 ATP Lyon Open defeating eight seed Pedro Martinez for his second top-50 win. Next he defeated Kwon Soon-woo to setup a quarterfinal with Alex de Minaur. As a result he returned to the top 225 in the rankings climbing 40 positions in the rankings at world No. 223 on 23 May 2022.

In November he won two back-to-back titles in Japan at the  Hyogo Noah Challenger in Kobe and in  Yokkaichi defeating Frederico Ferreira Silva in both and moved into the top 150 at world No. 145 on 28 November 2022.

2023: Grand Slam debut and first win
In January, Watanuki qualified for the 2023 Australian Open to make his Grand Slam debut. He beat Arthur Rinderknech in the first round in straight sets to advance to the second round.

Personal life
Watanuki has two brothers, Yusuke and Keisuke, who are both also professional tennis players.

Challenger and Futures Finals

Singles: 12  (8-4)

References

External links
 
 

1998 births
Living people
Japanese male tennis players
Sportspeople from Saitama (city)
Tennis players at the 2018 Asian Games
Medalists at the 2018 Asian Games
Asian Games medalists in tennis
Asian Games bronze medalists for Japan
21st-century Japanese people